David Palma is a Honduran swimmer. He competed in four events at the 1984 Summer Olympics.

References

External links
 

Year of birth missing (living people)
Living people
Honduran male swimmers
Olympic swimmers of Honduras
Swimmers at the 1984 Summer Olympics
Place of birth missing (living people)